Casey A. Royer, (born October 8, 1958), is an American musician. In a career spanning more than 30 years, Royer is best known as the lead vocalist for Southern Californian punk rock band D.I. and as a drummer for the Adolescents.

Early years
Casey A. Royer was born on October 8, 1958. Royer attended Troy High School, and began playing music with friends in the neighborhoods of Fullerton and Placentia, California. A shifting group of friends formed bands and played at parties and other gigs during their high school years.

Career
Royer began playing the drums professionally in 1978 at the age of 20, as an early member of Social Distortion with Mike Ness, composing the group's early lyrics with occasional help from original lead vocalist Tom Corvin. He later drummed with the Detours, and after leaving Social Distortion, he became the lead vocalist of a Social Distortion splinter group before disbanding it to drum for the Adolescents on and off between 1980 and 1987. After the Adolescents' first break-up in 1981, Casey formed D.I., where he is the lead vocalist, primary songwriter and only consistent member.

When the Adolescents reformed in 1986, Casey returned to the band but left before the 1987 reunion album Brats in Battalions was recorded. He rejoined them again in 2001–2002 for their 20th Anniversary Tour. Casey also joined former Adolescents band members in the band ADZ from 1989–93, after which he again made D.I. his primary focus. He has been the only constant member through many D.I. line-up shifts since the band's inception.

Personal life
Royer was married in 1988, which lasted for three years, and had two children, Max, born in 1989, and Casey, born in 1998.

Legal problems
In 2011, Royer had a drug overdose while watching television with his then-12-year-old son at home in Newport Beach. After his son went for help, Royer was arrested and charged with child endangerment and being under the influence of a controlled substance. The child endangerment charges were dropped, but he was convicted of the misdemeanor drug charge and sentenced to 90 days in jail and three years of probation.

References

External links
 
 

1958 births
American punk rock drummers
American male drummers
Social Distortion members
Living people
Adolescents (band) members
Place of birth missing (living people)
Singers from California
American punk rock singers
Triple X Records artists
Suburban Noize Records artists
20th-century American drummers